Glory is an unincorporated community in Berrien County, Georgia, United States.

A post office called Glory was established in 1899, and remained in operation until being discontinued in 1910.

References

Unincorporated communities in Berrien County, Georgia
Unincorporated communities in Georgia (U.S. state)